The Busca Una Mujer Tour was a concert tour performed by Luis Miguel during 1989 and 1990 to promote his last album Busca una Mujer. In 1989 a VHS video was released, a compilation of his presentations in Mexico called Un Año de Conciertos.

Set list 
This set list is representative of one show in Hotel Crowne Plaza, Mexico City. It does not represent all dates throughout the tour.

 "Introduction" 
 "Soy Como Quiero Ser"
 "Sunny"
 "Es Mejor"
 "Perdoname" 
 "Separados"
 "Yo Que No Vivo Sin Ti"
 "Ahora Te Puedes Marchar"
 "Culpable O No"
 "Isabel"
 "Yesterday" (The Beatles cover)
 "Pupilas de Gato"
 Duets Medley:
"Sin Hablar" 
"No Me Puedo Escapar de Ti"
"Me Gustas Tal Como Eres"  
 "Siempre Me Quedo, Siempre Me Voy"
 "Cucurrucucú Paloma"
 "Fría Como el Viento"
 "Por Favor Señora"
 "Soy Un Perdedor"
 "La Incondicional"
 "Un Hombre Busca Una Mujer" 
 "Cuando Calienta El Sol" 
 "Palabra De Honor"

Tour dates

Note: A lot of dates and venues are missing due to the lack of reliable sources.

Cancelled shows

Band 
Vocals: Luis Miguel
Guitar: Hector Hermosillo
Bass: Jaime de la Parra (1989), Rudy Machorro (1990)
Piano & Keyboards: Heriberto Hermosillo
Keyboards: Jorge René González
Drums: Álvaro López, Fernando Caballero (1990)
Percussion: Julio Vera
Saxophone: Adolfo Díaz
Backing Vocals: Marina Rivera, Silvia Rivera, Renata Rivera

Notes

References

Luis Miguel concert tours
1989 concert tours
1990 concert tours